Microsoft Campus Agreement (MSCA) is a program intended to offer significant discounts on Microsoft products to students, faculty, and staff of select universities which enter into a yearly contract with Microsoft. (Windows XP Professional sells, at some University stores, for as low as $10.00 .) Each software package available under the MSCA can be purchased only once. Upon graduation, students can typically receive perpetual licenses for the purchased software.

Current arrangement 
Software sold under MSCA licenses included Windows XP Professional, versions of Microsoft Office and the Visual Studio .NET suite of developer tools.

Additionally, MSCA licensing required those who purchased Windows XP Professional have an existing Windows license and allowed for Office products to be installed on, at most, two computers.

Legacy licenses 
Prior to 2003, MSCA licensed software was distinguishable from non-MSCA licensed software in that the CDs were not holographic, did not require activation (for those products which would have otherwise required activation), and, in some cases, did not require a valid license key.

Examples of participating universities 
 Indian Institute of Technology, Delhi
 Ball State University
 California State University
 Community Colleges of Spokane
 DeVry University
Federal University of Viçosa
 Hong Kong University of Science and Technology
 Iowa State University
 Lancaster University
 Life Pacific College
 Massachusetts Institute of Technology
 Norwegian University of Science and Technology
 Morrisville State College
 Oklahoma State University
 Purdue University
 Texas A&M University
 Texas Tech University
 University of Calgary
 University of Chicago
 University of Florida
 University of Houston
University of Iowa
 University of Leeds
 University of Texas at Austin
 University of Twente
 Worcester Polytechnic Institute
 University of Westminster
 Independent Colleges and Universities of Texas (ICUT), representing approximately forty Texas institutions of higher learning, entered an annual Consortium Campus agreement beginning in 2000 to provide all member institutions with MSCA access.  ICUT members represent over 85,000 full-time students and nearly 30,000 part-time students.  Some members are listed below:
Abilene Christian University
Baylor University
Beijing Jiaotong University
Dallas Baptist University
Hardin-Simmons University
McMurry University
Rice University
Shandong University
Southern Methodist University
Texas Christian University
University of Dallas

References

External links 
 (broken as 19 Sep 2014) Microsoft Campus and School License Rights and Product Use Rights

Microsoft initiatives